Basant Bahar, directed by Raja Nawathe, is a 1956 Indian film. This musical had nine outstanding songs, with lyrics written by Shailendra and Hasrat Jaipuri; and music composition by Shankar–Jaikishan. The movie is an adaptation of the Kannada novel Hamsageethe by TaRaSu. Hamsa means swan and Geethe means song. It is believed that before a swan dies, it will sing without opening its mouth. That mutter of melody is believed to be unmatched since any scene of lyricism falls short of its reach.

Plot
The film begins with Gopal Joshi (Bharat Bhushan) singing a raga. His father, Narsin Joshi (Om Prakash), the royal astrologer, comes and scolds him for singing and says he should become an astrologer. On the other hand, in his neighbourhood, his neighbour Malaya, the son of the royal musician is scolded by his father for being lesser than Gopal in singing. He is preparing him for a music competition, the winner of which will become the royal musician. At the same time, Gopal enters and says that he will not participate, to which Malaya's father refuses, and convinces Gopal to participate. On the day of the competition however, Malaya gives Gopal some holy water. He has secretly added a poison that ruins Gopal's singing ability. He loses the competition. Shortly thereafter, he loses his voice completely. A new friend Gopi (Nimmi) who is a dancer,  eventually helps him regain his voice. Gopal eventually gets to sing in front of the king and impress him.

Cast
 Bharat Bhushan        	 as	Gopal
 Nimmi                  	 as	Gopi
 Kumkum      	 as	Radhika (as Kum Kum)
 Manmohan Krishna      	 as	Lehri Baba
 Parsuram            	                (as Parashram)
 Chand Burke          	 as	Leelabai (as Chand Burque)
 Shyam Kumar (actor)		
 S. K. Prem		
 Babu Raje		
 S. B. Nayampalli	                (as Nayam Pally)
 Indira		
 Chandrashekhar (actor)	 as	Emperor (as Chandra Shekhar)
 Leela Chitnis	         as	Gopal's mom
 Om Prakash        	 as	Narsin

Awards
 National Film Awards
 1956 - Certificate of Merit for Best Feature Film in Hindi

Soundtrack

References

External links
 

1956 films
1950s Hindi-language films
Films scored by Shankar–Jaikishan
Indian epic films
Films directed by Raja Nawathe
Indian musical films
1956 musical films
Indian black-and-white films